Heinz Ditgens (3 July 1914 – 20 June 1998) was a German professional footballer who played club football for Borussia Mönchengladbach. He won three caps for the German national side between 1936 and 1938, participating at the 1936 Summer Olympics, and became Borussia Mönchengladbach's first ever international player in the process. Ditgens also fought at Stalingrad in World War II.

References

External links

Player profile at Borussia Mönchengladbach 

1914 births
1998 deaths
German footballers
Germany international footballers
German Army personnel of World War II
Borussia Mönchengladbach players
Olympic footballers of Germany
Footballers at the 1936 Summer Olympics
German football managers
Borussia Mönchengladbach managers
Sportspeople from Mönchengladbach
Association football midfielders
Footballers from North Rhine-Westphalia